IIAB may refer to:

IIAB meteorites, a type of meteorite
Internet-in-a-Box, an electronic device holding a low cost digital library